Alexey Gennadievich Nilov (born 31 January 1964) is a Soviet and Russian film and theater actor. Honored Artist of the Russian Federation (2006).

Biography
Alexey Nilov was born in Leningrad on 31 January 1964, into a creative family.

Nilov is an actor in the second generation. His father, actor Gennadi Nilov, the audience remembered one of the main roles in the famous Soviet comedy film Three Plus Two – the role of the chemist Stepan Ivanovich Sundukov and Major Committee for State Security of the Soviet Union – drama Anna Karamazoff.

In 1985, Nilov Jr. graduated from the acting department Russian State Institute of Performing Arts. The specialty  film and theater actor.

Immediately after graduation, one year served in the Soviet Army in the city of Chernigov. I got a military specialty miner-bomber. In 1986, during military service, he participated in the liquidation of consequences of the Chernobyl disaster. Is the liquidators of the Chernobyl accident I level.

Career
Alexey Nilov first appeared on the silver screen at the age of four-plus years in the Soviet feature film, a fairy tale  (1968), his great-grandfather, directed by Pavel Kadochnikov. The same film was shot and his father Alexey small, actor Gennadi Nilov.

The widespread popularity of the actor brought one of the main roles (Andrey Larin, a police captain) in the television series Streets of Broken Lights (1997–2004, from the 1st to the 5th season).

Selected filmography
 1968 – Snegurocka as episode
 1991 – Labelled as Maxim (Max), a fighter with the local mafia in Crimea
 1994 –  The Year of the Dog as neighbor Vera's
 1997 – 2004 – Streets of Broken Lights (1–5 seasons) as Andrey   Larin
 2000 – Deadly Force (1 season) as Andrey   Larin
 2003 – One Life as Vladimir, science fiction writer
 2004 – My Mother, the Bride as Yuri Ivanovsky
 2008 – 2014 – Liteyny, 4 (1–8 seasons) as Alexey Nilov, a former lawyer
 2015 – High Stakes as Yury Alexeyevich Sergeev, the owner of an illegal casino

References

External links

 Алексей Нилов. Обзор фильмов с участием актёра. Фотографии. // afisha.ru

1964 births
Living people
Soviet male child actors
Soviet male film actors
Soviet male stage actors
Male actors from Saint Petersburg
Russian male film actors
Russian male television actors
Russian male stage actors
20th-century Russian male actors
21st-century Russian male actors
Honored Artists of the Russian Federation
Russian State Institute of Performing Arts alumni